Union Flat Creek is a  long tributary of the Palouse River. Beginning at an elevation of  near Genesee in northern Nez Perce County, Idaho, it flows west into Whitman County, Washington, passing through the towns of Uniontown and Colton.

See also
List of rivers of Washington
List of rivers of Idaho
List of longest streams of Idaho

References

Rivers of Whitman County, Washington
Rivers of Nez Perce County, Idaho
Rivers of Washington (state)
Rivers of Idaho